Södra Innerstaden was a city district in the central of Malmö Municipality, Sweden. On 1 July 2013, it was merged with Västra Innerstaden, forming Innerstaden. In 2012, Södra Innerstaden had a population of 34,671 of the municipality's 307,758. The area was 302 hectares.

Neighbourhoods
The neighbourhoods of Södra Innerstaden were:

References

Former city districts of Malmö